Vranja Peč is a small settlement in the hills above the Tuhinj Valley in the Municipality of Kamnik in the Upper Carniola region of Slovenia.

Church

The parish church in the settlement is dedicated to Saint Ulrich.

References

External links

Vranja Peč on Geopedia

Populated places in the Municipality of Kamnik